Catholic Memorial High School (or CMH) is a co-educational Catholic high school in Waukesha, Wisconsin. Established in 1949, it is a member of the National Catholic Educational Association and is a World School in the International Baccalaureate Organization.

Notable alumni and faculty

Brad Beyer, (Class of 1991), actor 
Mark Gundrum, (Class of 1988), legislator and jurist
Matt Katula, (Class of 2000), a long snapper for the NFL's Baltimore Ravens, New England Patriots and Minnesota Vikings
Leslie Osborne, (Class of 2001), member of the 2000 national championship soccer team and the USA Women's World Cup team
Jerry Schumacher, (Class of 1988), three-time All-American and three-time All-Big Ten selection in cross country and track at the University of Wisconsin–Madison from 1988 to 1993, Nike Oregon Project Coach
Bill Stetz, a guard for the NFL's Philadelphia Eagles
Meghan Coffey, (Class of 2002), Miss Wisconsin 2006
Brendan "Beebo" Cogavin - college football coach

References

Roman Catholic Archdiocese of Milwaukee
Educational institutions established in 1949
Catholic secondary schools in Wisconsin
International Baccalaureate schools in Wisconsin
Schools in Waukesha County, Wisconsin
1949 establishments in Wisconsin